Dirk Dier (born 16 February 1972) is a former professional tennis player from Germany.

Career
Dier, an under 12s and 14s national champion, was a semi finalist in the Orange Bowl. In 1990, he defeated  Leander Paes to win the boys' singles event in the Australian Open and also finished runner-up in the juniors at Queen's that year. He appeared in the main draw of a Grand Slam for the first time at the 1990 Wimbledon Championships, where he lost in the opening round to countryman Michael Stich.

His other two Grand Slam appearances came in 1996. The German exited in the first round of the 1996 French Open, to Felix Mantilla in four sets, but reached the second round in the US Open, with a win over Chuck Adams. He then faced second seed Thomas Muster, who beat him in straight sets.

Dier made just one quarter-final during his career on the ATP Tour, which was in the 1996 Bermuda Open. En route he defeated two top 100 players, Michael Joyce and Nicolas Lapentti.

As of September 2019, he is the coach of Angelique Kerber.

Junior Grand Slam finals

Singles: 1 (1 title)

ATP Challenger and ITF Futures finals

Singles: 11 (5–6)

Doubles: 16 (6–10)

Performance timeline

Singles

References

External links
 
 

1972 births
Living people
West German male tennis players
German male tennis players
Australian Open (tennis) junior champions
German tennis coaches
People from Sankt Ingbert
Grand Slam (tennis) champions in boys' singles